Smith's Corner is a community in the Canadian province of Nova Scotia, located in the Municipal District of West Hants .

References
Smith's Corner on Destination Nova Scotia

Communities in Hants County, Nova Scotia
General Service Areas in Nova Scotia